Jussi Mäkilä (born 10 September 1974) is a Finnish mountain bike orienteering competitor and World Champion. He won an individual gold medal at the 2002 World MTB Orienteering Championships, and gold medals in the relay in 2004, 2005 and 2006.

References

Finnish orienteers
Male orienteers
Finnish male cyclists
Mountain bike orienteers
1974 births
Living people
Place of birth missing (living people)
Finnish mountain bikers